Ma'bad ibn Kalid al-Juhanī (died 80 AH/ 699CE), was from the tribe of Juhaynah which lived and still live in around the city of Medinah in Saudi Arabia. He was Qadari, an idea he got from Sinbuya, and was declared as misguided by some of the companions of the Islamic prophet Muhammad, such as Abd Allah ibn Umar ibn al-Khattab 
He was crucified by the orders of the Caliph Abd al-Malik in Damascus. According to a couple of sahih hadith, "The first person to speak about Al-Qadar" (the doctrine of predestination) or at least the first person in Basra to speak about it, was "Ma'bad Al-Juhani." 
His ideas were later followed by Abū Marwān Gaylān ibn Mūslīm ad-Dimashqī an-Nabati al-Qībtī.

See also 
Qadariyyah
Sinbuya Asvari

References

Notes

Citations

699 deaths
Year of birth unknown

People executed by crucifixion
7th-century Arabs